This article provides details of international football games played by the Turkey national football team from 2020 to present.

Results

2020

2021

2022

Forthcoming fixtures
The following matches are scheduled:

Head to head records

See also
 Turkey national football team results (1923–1960)
 Turkey national football team results (1961–1980)
 Turkey national football team results (1981–1999) 
 Turkey national football team results (2000–2009) 
 Turkey national football team results (2010–2019)

Notes

References

Football in Turkey
Turkey national football team results
2020s in Turkish sport